The Perșani Mountains is a mountain range in central Romania.

Geologically, the Perșani Mountains are part of the Căliman-Harghita Mountains of the Inner Eastern Carpathians.  Within Romania, however, it is traditional to divide the Eastern Carpathians in Romanian territory into three geographical groups (north, center, south), instead.  The Romanian categorization includes the Perșani Mountains within the central Carpathians of Moldavia and Transylvania (Munții Carpați Moldo-Transilvani), which also comprise the Baraolt Mountains, the Bârgău Mountains, the Călimani Mountains, the Ciuc Mountains, the Gurghiu Mountains, and the Harghita Mountains. 

The Perșani Mountains consists mainly of basalt, shale, and flysch. It is mostly forested, and for the most part the elevations are rounded. The geologic diversity of the rock results in interesting natural phenomena (basalt formations, caves, canyons).

Mountain ranges of Romania
Mountain ranges of the Eastern Carpathians